The 2019 TCR Middle East Series season was the third season of the TCR Middle East Series. The series will be promoted by Creventic and Dubai Autodrome.

Teams and drivers

Calendar and results 
The 2019 schedule was announced on 8 August 2018, with three events held across the Middle East.

Notes

References

External links 
 

TCR
Middle East Series